Qué pena tu vida may refer to:

 Qué pena tu vida (Fuck My Life), 2010 Chilean film
 Qué pena tu vida (2016 film), Mexican film based on the Chilean film